The Trade Remedies Authority (TRA) is a non-departmental public body of the Department for Business and Trade in the Government of the United Kingdom. The organisation was established on 1 June 2021 after the passing of the Trade Act 2021. Formerly part of the Department for International Trade, the trade watchdog was set up post Brexit to police trade disputes.

References 

Non-departmental public bodies of the United Kingdom government
Organisations based in Reading, Berkshire
Government agencies established in 2021
2021 establishments in the United Kingdom